The Dallara IL-15 is an open-wheel formula racing car chassis, designed, developed and built by Dallara, and is the current spec-chassis for the one-make Indy Lights spec-series, a feeders series for IndyCar, which has been manufactured since 2015.

References

Open wheel racing cars
Indy Lights
Dallara racing cars